A detection dog or sniffer dog is a dog that is trained to use its senses to detect substances such as explosives, illegal drugs, wildlife scat, currency, blood, and contraband electronics such as illicit mobile phones. The sense most used by detection dogs is smell. Hunting dogs that search for game, and search dogs that work to find missing humans are generally not considered detection dogs. There is some overlap, as in the case of cadaver dogs, trained to search for human remains.

A police dog is essentially a detection dog that is used as a resource for police in specific scenarios such as conducting drug raids, finding missing criminals, and locating stashed currency. Frequently, detection dogs are thought to be used for law enforcement purposes. Experts say that dog-sniff evidence should not be used in the criminal justice system, pointing to wrongful convictions, human biases that skew animal behavior, and the lack of systematic research into what dogs detect or how they do it.

Although detection dogs are often used for law enforcement purposes, they are also used as a valuable research tool for wildlife biologists. In California, detection dogs are trained to discover quagga mussels on boats at public boat ramps because they are a harmful invasive species for the environment. Detection dogs also tend to be employed for the purposes of finding and collecting the feces of a diverse array of species, including caribou, black-footed ferret, killer whale, and Oregon spotted frog. This process is known as wildlife scat detection.

Detection dogs are also seeing use in the medical industry, as studies have revealed that canines are able to detect specific odours associated with numerous medical conditions, such as cancer.

Functions

Detection dogs have been trained to search for many things, both animate and inanimate, including:

 Bed bugs
 Cancer detection
 Currency (e.g. large amounts of money carried by passengers in airports that should be declared to customs)
 Drugs
 Endangered animal species (e.g., black-footed ferret) 
 Explosives
 Fire accelerants (e.g., arson investigation) 
 Firearms
 Gourmet Fungi, such as Truffles (e.g. French Black Truffles (Tuber melanosporum), Italian White Truffles (Tuber magnatum pico), Chanterelles (Cantharellus cibarius), "Porcini" (Boletus edulis), Morels (Morchella esculenta), and other varieties of mushroom that, when parasitized by Hypomyces Lactifluorum, are known as a "Lobster mushroom")
 Human remains
 Invasive species (e.g., quagga mussel) 
 Ivory
 Mobile phones (e.g. as contraband in prisons)
 Mold
 Plants, animals, produce, and agricultural items that have to go through customs
 SIM cards
 Termites
 USB drives
 Wildlife scat

Sniffer dogs can be trained to locate small infestations of invasive and non-native weeds. The world's first Spotted Knapweed K-9 detection program successfully completed field-testing for Montana State University in 2004. Upon completion of the testing, Knapweed Nightmare was finding low densities of non-native invasive knapweed rosettes in the field with a 93% overall success rate.

She followed it up with 98% in the final trials in open fields, demonstrating that dogs can effectively detect low densities of invasive plants.

Detection dogs are able to discern individual scents even when the scents are combined or masked by other odors. In 2002, a detection dog foiled a woman's attempt to smuggle marijuana into an Australian prison in Brisbane. The marijuana had been inserted into a balloon, which was smeared with coffee, pepper, and petroleum jelly and then placed in her bra.

Bed bug detection dogs
Detection dogs are often specially trained by handlers to identify the scent of bed bugs. With the increased focus on green pest management and integrated pest management, as well as the increase in global travel and shared living accommodations, bed bugs have become more prevalent. Detecting bed bugs is a complicated process because insects have the ability to hide almost anywhere. Detection dogs help solve this problem because of their size, speed, and sense of smell. Detection dogs use their unique ability to smell in parts per trillion in order to track bed bugs in every phase of their life cycle. They can find bugs in places humans cannot such as wall voids, crevices, and furniture gaps. Dogs are also a safer alternative to pesticide use. If detection dogs can find out exactly where bed bugs are located, they can minimize the area that needs to be sprayed.

The National Pest Management Association released their "Bed Bug Best Management Practices"  in 2011 which outlines the minimum recommendations regarding not only treatment, but the certification and use of bed bug detection canines.  The NPMA's Best Management Practices emphasizes the importance of having bed bug detection dog teams certified by third party organizations who are not affiliated to the trainer or company that sold the canine.

Scientists at the University of Kentucky reviewed studies on bed bug detection dogs and concluded that although expensive for operators, they are a reliable source as long as they undergo the proper training. In another study, detection dogs had a 97.5% correct positive indication rate on identifying bed bugs (Cimex lectularius) and their eggs – with zero false positives – all while accurately distinguishing them from carpenter ants, cockroaches, and termites. They also successfully differentiated live bed bugs and viable bed bug eggs from dead bed bugs, cast skins, and feces with a 95% correct positive indication rate.

Bed bug detection dogs should be certified by a national organization like the World Detector Dog Organization (WDDO) or the National Entomology Scent Detection Canine Association (NESDCA). There are a few independent K9 bed bug inspection companies that have multiple certifications.

Wildlife scat detection
Scat is abundant in the wild and contains valuable data. Wildlife scat detection represents a fairly non-invasive method of study for many species where live-capture once predominated. Compared with other methods of scat collection, dogs are able to survey larger areas in less time at decreased costs. Research shows that detection dogs can find laboratory rats and mice in a large rodent-free area of 32 hectares (an extremely large area). Some specific types of feces that detection dogs have had success in identifying include killer whale feces, northern spotted owl pellets, and salamanders.

COVID-19 detection

Some countries have trained dogs to detect COVID-19. Australia has been using some of these in 2021.

Researchers in Paris in March 2022 reported in a preprint not yet peer-reviewed that trained dogs were very effective for rapidly detecting the presence of SARS-Cov2 in people, whether displaying symptoms or not. The dogs were presented with sweat samples to smell from 335 people, of whom 78 with symptoms and 31 without tested positive by PCR. The dogs detected 97% of the symptomatic and 100% of the asymptomatic infections. They were 91% accurate at identifying volunteers who were not infected, and 94% accurate at ruling out the infection in people without symptoms. The authors said "Canine testing is non-invasive and provides immediate and reliable results. Further studies will be focused on direct sniffing by dogs to evaluate sniffer dogs for mass pre-test in airports, harbors, railways stations, cultural activities, or sporting events."

Criticism

Accuracy

Australia

In 2001, the Australian state of New South Wales introduced legislation that granted police with the power to use drug detection dogs without a warrant in public places such as licensed venues, music festivals, and public transport (see New South Wales Police Force strip search scandal). The law was reviewed in 2006 by the New South Wales Ombudsman, who handed down a critical report regarding the use of dogs for drug detection. The report stated that prohibited drugs were found in only 26% of searches following an indication by a drug sniffer dog. Of these, 84% were for small amounts of cannabis deemed for personal use. The report also found that the legislation was ineffective at detecting persons in supply of prohibited drugs, with only 0.19% of indications ultimately leading to a successful prosecution for supply.

United States
In 2011, civil rights activists claimed that detection dogs responses are influenced by the biases and behaviors of their handlers, which can hinder accuracy. Another factor that affects accuracy is residual odors. Residual odors can linger even after illegal materials have been removed from a particular area, and can lead to false alarms. Additionally, very few states have mandatory training, testing, or certification standards for detection dogs. This leaves people to question whether they are truly equipped to carry out searches.

Sniffer dogs can be trained to detect crop pests and diseases. A study by the US Department of Agriculture found that sniffer dogs identified trees infected with citrus greening disease with 99% accuracy; they could detect infection as early as two weeks after onset.

Civil rights
Detection dogs give police the potential to conduct searches without cause, in a manner that is unregulated. They are often accused of being motivated more by the state's desire to be seen doing something than by any serious desire to respond to the dangers of drugs use. In June 2012, three Nevada Highway Patrol officers filed suit against Nevada's Director of Public Safety, alleging that he violated the police dog program by intentionally training canines to be "trick ponies" to falsely alert based on cues from their handlers (Clever Hans effect) so as to enable officers to conduct illegal searches of vehicles. The lawsuit claims that in doing so, he and other top Highway Patrol officers had violated the federal Racketeer Influenced and Corrupt Organizations Act (RICO Act).

In Norway, students were subjected to a drug search in their classroom by a detection dog. The students didn't have to be present in the room while the dogs searched; however, they were forced to answer questions by the police instead.  An article in Tidsskrift for strafferett, Norway's journal of criminal law, claims that such searches breach Norwegian law.

Detector dogs have been used by secret police and security services to support campaigns of political persecution. For example, sweat collected from subjects following interrogation was used by the Stasi to train dogs to respond to their scent.

See also

References

Further reading
 NPR's All Things Considered: Using Dogs to Sniff Out Bed Bugs
 Fox Philadelphia: "Bed Bug Dog and Bed Bug Control Experts discussing use of Bed Bug Dogs"
Braverman, Irus. 2013. "Passing the Sniff Test: Police Dogs as Surveillance Technology." Buffalo Law Review 61 (81): 81–167.
Blum, Binyamin. 2017. "The Hounds of Empire: Forensic Dog Tracking in Britain and Its Colonies, 1888-1953." Law and History Review 35: 621–65.

External links

 
Dog training and behavior
Explosive detection
Scent hounds
Working dogs